The Vulcan Foundry Limited was an English locomotive builder sited at Newton-le-Willows, Lancashire (now Merseyside).

History
The Vulcan Foundry opened in 1832, as  Charles Tayleur and Company  to produce girders for bridges, switches, crossings and other ironwork following the opening of the Liverpool and Manchester Railway. Due to the distance from the locomotive works in Newcastle-upon-Tyne, it seemed preferable to build and support them locally. In 1832, Robert Stephenson became a partner for a few years.  The company had become The Vulcan Foundry Company in 1847 and acquired limited liability in 1864.  From the beginning of 1898, the name changed again to The Vulcan Foundry Limited, dropping the word 'company.'

Vulcan Halt
The wooden-platformed halt was opened on 1 November 1916 by the London and North Western Railway, and closed on 12 June 1965.

Steam locomotives

Details of the earliest locomotives are not precisely known despite  an "official" list apparently concocted in the 1890s which contains a lot of guesswork and invention, with many quite fictitious locomotives, for the period before 1845.  This list claims that the first two locomotives were 0-4-0 Tayleur and Stephenson built in 1833 for "Mr Hargreaves, Bolton", but this seems unlikely.  The earliest authenticated products were 0-4-0 Titan and Orion, similar to Stephenson's design, and delivered in September and October 1834 to the Liverpool & Manchester Railway. Other early orders came from the Leicester and Swannington Railway and there were also some 4-2-0s for America which were among the first British 'bogie' locomotives.

From 1835 the company was selling to Belgium, France, and in 1836 to Austria and Russia, the beginnings of an export trade which was maintained throughout the life of the company.  The company's locomotives had a strong Stephenson influence, many during the following decade being of the "long boiler" design. In 1852 the first locomotives ever to run in India were supplied to the Great Indian Peninsula Railway.

A number of Fairlie locomotives were built, including Taliesin for the Ffestiniog Railway, Mountaineer for the Denver & Rio Grande Railway, and Josephine one of the NZR E class (1872). During 1870 the company supplied the first locomotives to run in Japan, and a flangeless 0-4-0T for a steelworks in Tredegar which was still using angle rails. A number of Matthew Kirtley's double-framed goods engines were also produced for the Midland Railway.    In c.1911, following a report by the Locomotive Committee on Standard Locomotives for Indian Railways which was published in 1910, North-Western Railway, a regional railway at that time operated by the Indian State Railway, ordered eleven broad gauge locomotives, measuring 5 feet 6 inches between the rails, favoured because it allowed the engineers designing the locomotives to build larger fireboxes and boilers, enabling the engines to pull longer and heavier loads.

The healthy export trade continued, particularly to India and South America, and continued after World War I.  

Following the formation of the London, Midland and Scottish Railway in 1923 some very large orders were received, including over a hundred LMS Fowler Class 3F 0-6-0T engines and seventy-five LMS Compound 4-4-0 locomotives.

The most notable design manufactured for an overseas railway during this period was the large 4-8-4 built for the Chinese National Railways in 1934–35. These fine locomotives were equipped with a mechanical stoker and six of them were fitted with booster engines on the tender, providing an extra  tractive effort. Of the 24 exported, one returned to the UK and is preserved at the National Railway Museum in York.

Through the 1930s the company survived the trade recessions with the aid of more orders from India, some from Tanganyika and Argentina, and a large order in 1934 from the LMS for 4-6-0 "Black Fives" and 2-8-0 Stanier-designed locomotives.

During 1953-54 the company built sixty J class 2-8-0 locomotives for the Victorian Railways in Australia.

Second World War
From 1939 the works was mostly concerned with the war effort, becoming involved in the development and production of the Matilda II tank. From 1943 large orders were received from the Ministry of Supply for locomotives, 390 Austerity 2-8-0s and fifty Austerity 0-6-0 saddle tanks.

In 1944 the Vulcan Foundry acquired Robert Stephenson and Hawthorns and in 1945 received an order for 120 "Liberation" 2-8-0 locomotives for the United Nations Relief and Rehabilitation Administration in Europe.

The war had left India's railways in a parlous state and in 1947, with foreign aid, embarked on a massive rebuilding plan. The Vulcan Foundry benefited from orders for XE, XD, and YD 2-8-2s; and ten WG 2-8-2s sub-contracted from the North British Locomotive Company, but the writing was on the wall for all British manufacturers. Not only was the competition fierce from other countries, but India had developed the ability to build its own locomotives.

Diesel and electric locomotives

The company had experience of both diesel and electric locomotives, having built thirty-one so-called "Crocodile" 2600 hp 1,500 V DC electric freight locomotives in 1929 for India. These were classified as EF/1 which after Indian independence became the WCG-1 class. India's National Rail Museum, New Delhi exhibits an WCG-1 locomotive from the Vulcan foundry. They also helped in supply of the WCM-1 and WCM-2 class.

In 1931, the company supplied the first experimental diesel shunter to the London, Midland and Scottish Railway. In 1936, Vulcan, a diesel-mechanical 0-6-0 shunter with  a Vulcan-Frichs 6-cylinder 275 hp (205 kW) diesel engine was loaned to the LMS, and was then used by the War Department, which numbered it 75 (later 70075). Following the end of World War II, it found industrial use in Yugoslavia.

In 1938, ten diesel railcars were ordered by New Zealand Railways, the NZR RM class (Vulcan). They were supplied in 1940, although one was lost at sea to enemy action. In 1948, it supplied 10 Class 15 Diesel Electric shunters to Malayan Railways, as well as twenty Class 20 Diesel Electric locomotives for the same company nine years later.

The works has produced many locomotives for both domestic and foreign railways. It was a major supplier of diesel-electrics to British Railways notably the Class 55 Deltic. The works also developed a prototype gas turbine locomotive, the British Rail GT3. Other classes of diesel locomotives to be built for British Railways at the Vulcan Foundry included: Class 20, Class 37, Class 40 and Class 50. Electric locomotives were also built for British Rail by Vulcan Foundry,  which included many Class 86s in 1965 and 1966.

In the mid-1950s, negotiations began to sell the company. In 1957, the purchase was finalised and the business became part of the English Electric group.

Although the works still produced diesel engines under name Ruston Paxman Diesels Limited, which had been moved from Lincoln, locomotive manufacturing finished in 1970. Output was mainly for marine and stationary applications, but the company was the supplier of choice for British Rail Engineering Limited for locomotives built at Doncaster and Crewe.

Sale and closure
The factory passed through various hands as English Electric was bought by GEC, which in turn became GEC Alsthom (later renamed Alstom) and finally as part of MAN Diesel in 2000. At the end of 2002, the works closed. It was then an industrial estate, appropriately called "Vulcan Industrial Estate". The site is just north of Winwick Junction, where the line to Newton-le-Willows branches off to the west from the West Coast Main Line.  All the former factory buildings on the site were demolished in October 2007 however, the workers cottages, known as "Vulcan Village", still survive at the southern corner of the site. By early 2010, work had started on the construction of 630 homes on the levelled site by the developer St Modwen.

References

Sources

External links

Earlestown History Earlestown
Newton le Willows History Newton le Willows
Built By Vulcan Engine Museum
The Vulcan Foundry, Newton-le-Willows Enuii
Vulcan Foundry Steam Index

Buildings and structures in the Metropolitan Borough of St Helens
Locomotive manufacturers of the United Kingdom
Defunct manufacturing companies of the United Kingdom
Manufacturing companies established in 1832
Newton-le-Willows
1832 establishments in England